Candice McLeod (born 15 November 1996) is a Jamaican athlete, a finalist in the women’s 400 metres races at the 2020 Olympic Games and the 2022 World Athletics Championships.

Early and personal life
McLeod attended Vere Technical High School where she was befriended and mentored by future athletics champion Shericka Jackson, before McLeod went on to become an accounting graduate from the University of West Indies.

Career
At the Jamaican Olympic Trials, in June 2021, McLeod lowered her personal best time for a sixth time in a year, running 49.91 seconds in the 400 metres to finish second behind Stephenie Ann McPherson. This secured McLeod’s slot on the Jamaican team for the delayed 2020 Summer Games. 

In the 400 metres races at the Tokyo Olympics McLeod won her heat, and then ran a new personal best time of 49.51 seconds in her semi final and qualified for the final in which she finished in sixth place. At the 2022 World Athletics Championships McLeod matched the feat of reaching the final. She won a silver medal in the women's 4 × 400 metres relay.

References

External links
 

Living people
1996 births
Jamaican female sprinters
Athletes (track and field) at the 2020 Summer Olympics
Medalists at the 2020 Summer Olympics
Olympic bronze medalists in athletics (track and field)
Olympic bronze medalists for Jamaica
Olympic female sprinters
Olympic athletes of Jamaica
World Athletics Championships medalists
21st-century Jamaican women